El Torito (Spanish for "the little bull") is an American chain that serves Mexican food. El Torito operates 69 restaurants primarily in California. El Torito is one of several Mexican cuisine restaurant chains operated by Xperience Restaurant Group.

Founded in 1954, El Torito claims to be "a pioneer in the California full service Mexican casual dining restaurant segment."

History
El Torito was founded in 1954 by Larry J. Cano. Cano served several tours in Europe and in Korea, got a business degree and worked as a bartender. When the bar's owner died, the widow gave Cano the restaurant. Cano then began serving Mexican food at the bar and it became the first El Torito. Cano, at one point became financially strapped and moved into the restaurant.

Within three years the restaurant became successful, and Cano opened additional locations. By 1976 he had 20 locations, and sold the business to W. R. Grace and Company for about $20 million. They hired Cano as the President with a directive for rapid expansion.

Grace sold its restaurants in a leveraged buyout in 1986. The resulting firm, Restaurant Enterprises Group (REG), filed for bankruptcy in 1993. REG was acquired out of bankruptcy in 1994 by Foodmaker, who renamed itself Family Restaurants, then Koo Koo Roo Enterprises, then Prandium. In 2000, Acapulco bought El Torito from Prandium. Acapulco renamed its parent company to Real Mex Restaurants in 2004 and moved the headquarters to Cypress, California.

On October 3, 2011, Real Mex Restaurants filed for Chapter 11 bankruptcy and announced that it was putting itself up for sale, citing the poor economy as a reason. No plans were announced to close restaurants or layoff staff. It was acquired by a group of its noteholders in a bankruptcy auction in 2012.

In 2018, FM Restaurants HoldCo, LLC acquired Real Mex Restaurants out of bankruptcy and begun operation under Xperience Restaurant Group led by former Vice President of Operations of the El Torito division, Randy Sharpe.  In 2020, during the pandemic, the group begun renovations of 19 of their 31 locations in Southern California.

References

Mexican restaurants
Restaurants in Orange County, California
Companies based in Orange County, California
Cuisine of the Western United States
Restaurant chains in the United States
Restaurants established in 1954
1976 mergers and acquisitions
1986 mergers and acquisitions
2000 mergers and acquisitions
2012 mergers and acquisitions
1954 establishments in California
Companies that filed for Chapter 11 bankruptcy in 1993
Companies that filed for Chapter 11 bankruptcy in 2011
Companies that filed for Chapter 11 bankruptcy in 2018